The Snakey Wake was a fan-club only release of music played by The Residents at the wake of their longtime friend, Snakefinger. It is one track that is about 20 minutes long, but there are parts of the track.

Track listing
 The Snakey Wake
 Six More Miles
 Laments
 Exotica
 Primal
 Depart

The Residents albums
1988 albums
Fan-club-release albums